Erskine May (full title: Erskine May: Parliamentary Practice, original title: A Treatise upon the Law, Privileges, Proceedings and Usage of Parliament) is a parliamentary authority originally written by British constitutional theorist and Clerk of the House of Commons, Thomas Erskine May (later the 1st Baron Farnborough).

Erskine May is considered to be the most authoritative and influential work on parliamentary procedure and the constitutional conventions affecting Parliament which form a major part of the uncodified UK constitution. It is not a rigid set of rules but a description of how the procedure evolved and of the conventions. Such is the authority of the text that it is regarded as analogous to part of the constitution itself.

Since its first publication in 1844, the book has frequently been updated. Erskine May edited nine editions of the book in his lifetime. Updates have continued into the present day; the 25th edition was published on 28 May 2019. The Speaker's Commission on Digital Democracy recommended in 2015 that "Erskine May, the definitive guide to parliamentary procedure, should be freely available online by the time the next edition is produced." This took effect in July 2019 with the 25th edition.

The work has been influential outside the United Kingdom, particularly in countries that use the Westminster system.

Editions

Contents of the book

Contents of 1st edition
 Book I: Constitution, Powers, and Privileges of Parliament.
 Chapter I: Preliminary view of the constituent parts of Parliament: The Crown, The Lords Spiritual and Temporal, and the Knights, Citizens, and Burgesses; with incidental reference to their ancient history and constitution.
 Chapter II: Power and Jurisdiction of Parliament collectively. Rights and Power of each of its constituent parts.
 Chapter III: General view of the Privileges of Parliament: Power of commitment by both Houses for Breaches of Privilege. Causes of commitment cannot be inquired into by Courts of Law; nor the prisoners admitted to bail. Acts construed as Breaches of Privilege. Different punishments inflicted by the two Houses.
 Chapter IV: Privilege of Freedom of Speech confirmed by the ancient law of Parliament and by statute: its nature and limits.
 Chapter V: Freedom from Arrest or Molestation: its antiquity; limits, and mode of enforcement. Privilege of not being impleaded in civil actions: of not being liable to be summoned by subpoena or to serve on juries. Commitment of Members by Courts of Justice. Privilege of witnesses and others in attendance on Parliament.
 Chapter VI: Jurisdiction of Courts of Law in matters of Privilege.
 Book II: Practice and Proceedings in Parliament.
 Chapter VII: Introductory remarks. Meeting of a new Parliament. Election and Royal Approbation of the Speaker of the Commons. Oaths. Queen's Speech, and Addresses in answer. Places of Peers and Members of the House of Commons. Attendance on the service of Parliament. Office of Speaker in both Houses. Principal Officers. Journals. Admission of Strangers. Prorogation.
 Chapter VIII: Motions and Questions. Notices of Motions. Questions moved and seconded. Motions withdrawn. Questions superseded by Adjournment; or by reading the Orders of the Day. Previous Questions. New Questions substituted by Amendment. Complicated Questions. Questions put.
 Chapter IX: Amendments to Questions; and Amendments to proposed Amendments.
 Chapter X: The same Question or Bill may not be twice offered in a Session.
 Chapter XI: Rules of Debate: Manner and time of speaking: Rules and orders to be observed by Members in speaking, and in attending to Debates.
 Chapter XII: Divisions. Mode of dividing in both Houses. Proxies and Pairs. Protests. Members personally interested.
 Chapter XIII: Committees of the whole House: General rules of proceeding: Chairman: Motions and Debate: House resumed.
 Chapter XIV: Appointment, Constitution, Powers and Proceedings of Select Committees in both Houses.
 Chapter XV: Witnesses: Modes of Summons and Examination: Administration of Oaths: Expenses.
 Chapter XVI: Communications between the Lords and Commons: Messages and Conferences: Joint Committees, and Committees communicating with each other.
 Chapter XVII: Communications from the Crown to Parliament: Their forms and character: How acknowledged: Addresses to the Crown: Messages to Members of the Royal Family; and communications from them.
 Chapter XVIII: Proceedings of Parliament in passing Public Bills; Their several stages in both Houses. Royal Assent.
 Chapter XIX: Ancient mode of petitioning Parliament: Form and character of modern Petitions: Practice of both Houses in receiving them.
 Chapter XX: Accounts, Papers and Records presented to Parliament: Printing and distribution of them: Arrangement and statistical value of Parliamentary Returns.
 Chapter XXI: Progressive influence of the Commons in granting Supplies, and imposing Burthens upon the People. Exclusion of the Lords from the right of amending Money Bills. Constitutional functions of the Crown and of the Commons, in matters of Supply. Modern rules and practice in voting Money and imposing Pecuniary Burthens. Committees of Supply and Ways and Means.
 Chapter XXII: Issue of Writs, and Trial of Controverted Elections by the House of Commons.
 Chapter XXIII: Impeachment by the Commons; grounds of accusation; form of charge; articles of impeachment; the trial and judgment: proceedings not concluded by prorogation or dissolution; pardon not pleadable. Trial of Peers. Bills of Attainder and of Pains and Penalties.
 Book III: The Manner of passing Private Bills.
 Chapter XXIV: Distinctive character of Private Bills: preliminary view of the proceedings of Parliament in passing them.
 Chapter XXV: Conditions to be observed by parties before Private Bills are introduced into Parliament: Notices and deposit of plans, &c.: Estimates and subscription contracts.
 Chapter XXVI: Course of proceedings upon Private Bills introduced into the House of Commons; with the rules, orders, and practice applicable to each stage of such Bills in succession, and to particular classes of Bills.
 Chapter XXVII: Course of Proceedings in the Lords upon Private Bills sent up from the Commons.
 Chapter XXVIII: Rules, orders, and course of proceedings in the Lords upon Private Bills brought into that House upon Petition; and proceedings of the Commons upon Private Bills brought from the Lords. Local and Personal, and Private Acts of Parliament.
 Chapter XXIX: Fees payable by the parties promoting or opposing Private Bills. Costs of Parliamentary Agents and others.

Contents of 24th edition
 Part 1: Constitution and organization of Parliament
 Chapter 1: The constituent parts of Parliament
 Chapter 2: Elections
 Chapter 3: Disqualification for membership of either House
 Chapter 4: Members and Officers of Parliament [including Payment of Members]
 Chapter 5: Rules governing the conduct of Members of both Houses and the disclosure of financial interests
 Chapter 6: Administration of Parliament and the Parliamentary Estate
 Chapter 7: Parliamentary papers and publications
 Chapter 8: A new Parliament and opening and closing of session
 Chapter 9: Formal communications between Crown and Parliament and between Lords and Commons
 Chapter 10: Parliament and international assemblies
 Part 2: Powers and privileges of Parliament
 Chapter 11: Power and jurisdiction of Parliament [including Summoning of witnesses and Penal jurisdiction of both Houses]
 Chapter 12: The privilege of Parliament
 Chapter 13: Privilege of freedom of speech
 Chapter 14: Privilege of freedom from arrest
 Chapter 15: Contempts
 Chapter 16: Complaints of breach of privilege or contempt
 Chapter 17: The courts and parliamentary privilege
 Part 3: Conduct of business
 Chapter 18: A sitting: general arrangements in the House of Commons
 Chapter 19: The control and distribution of time in the House of Commons
 Chapter 20: Outline of the business of the House of Commons
 Chapter 21: The process of debate in the House of Commons by motion, question and decision
 Chapter 22: Maintenance of order during debates in the House of Commons
 Chapter 23: Methods of curtailing debate
 Chapter 24: Public petitions
 Chapter 25: Organization and conduct of business in the House of Lords
 Part 4: Public legislation
 Chapter 26: Preliminary view of public bills [including Pre-legislative scrutiny]
 Chapter 27: Proceedings on public bills in the House of Commons [including Committee of the whole House]
 Chapter 28: Proceedings on public bills in the House of Lords
 Chapter 29: Proceedings on public bills: matters affecting both Houses [including ping-pong and Parliament Acts]
 Chapter 30: Delegated legislation
 Chapter 31: Parliamentary oversight of European Union matters
 Part 5: Financial procedure
 Chapter 32: Financial procedure – general
 Chapter 33: Public expenditure and Supply
 Chapter 34: Expenditure: Money resolutions
 Chapter 35: Ways and Means and Finance Bills
 Chapter 36: The role of the House of Lords in financial procedure
 Part 6: Committees
 Chapter 37: Select committees in the House of Commons
 Chapter 38: General committees in the House of Commons
 Chapter 39: Select committees in the House of Lords
 Chapter 40: Joint committees of the Lords and Commons
 Part 7: Private legislation
 Chapter 41: Preliminary view of private bills
 Chapter 42: Preliminary proceedings in both Houses on private bills
 Chapter 43: Petitions in favour of, against, or relating to private bills in the House of Commons; and the Court of Referees
 Chapter 44: Proceedings in the House of Commons on private bills
 Chapter 45: Proceedings on private and personal bills in the House of Lords

See also
 Cabinet Manual (United Kingdom)

References

External links

The current edition of Erskine May (the 25th edition)
Sir Erskine May (9th edition, 1883)
T Lonsdale Webster (12th edn, 1917)
Sir Gilbert Campion (14th edition, 1946) 
Erskine May: Parliamentary Practice can be found in various editions, including:
  (18th edition, 1971)
  (19th edition, 1976)
  (20th edition, 1983)
  (21st edition, 1989)
  (22nd edition, 1997)
  (23rd edition, 2004)
  (24th edition, 2011)

1844 non-fiction books
Parliament of the United Kingdom
Parliamentary authority
Parliamentary procedure
Books about politics of the United Kingdom
Constitution of the United Kingdom
Treatises